Portnoy (formerly known as The Portnoy Brothers) are a British-Israeli folk rock duo formed in 2014 by Manchester-born brothers Sruli (born 1990; vocals, guitar) and Mendy Portnoy (born 1992; keyboards). Their debut album, as The Portnoy Brothers, Learn to Love, was released independently on 23 September 2016. On 29 March 2019 they released "The Garden Sessions" EP under their new name, Portnoy.

History
Sruli and Mendy Portnoy were born in Manchester, England, later moving to Israel as adults. Their father was an orchestra conductor-turned-rabbi. They played music separately from a young age and began playing together at around 14 years old.

The Portnoy brothers began recording their debut album, Learn to Love, in 2013 with bassist and engineer Alon Hillel. The album was co-funded by fans via an Indiegogo campaign, which raised £9,315 GBP. In January 2016, they released a video for the album's closing track, "Timebound", as a tribute to David Bowie shortly after his death. In May 2016, they appeared at the Day to Praise Israel Independence Day event. The album was released on 23 September 2016.

Originally a YouTube series of live performances, PORTNOY released The Garden Sessions as an EP on 29 March 2019. The release included live renditions of four of the band's songs: 'Old Soul', 'Seeing is Believing', 'Tomorrow's Yesterday' and 'Memories'.

A sophomore album, No Complaints, was released on October 31, 2019. The album was recorded in Nashville, Tennessee, and the band chose the name as a nod to the novel Portnoy's Complaint.

Musical style
PORTNOY have cited The Beatles, Stevie Wonder, and Simon & Garfunkel as musical influences.

Discography

Albums 
Learn to Love (2016)
No Complaints (2019)

Extended plays 

 The Garden Sessions EP (2019)

Singles and music videos 
"Learn to Love" (2014)
"Memories" (2015)
"Tomorrow's Yesterday" (2015)
"Stars Aglow"/"Timebound" (2016)
"Brothers in Arms" (2016)
"Old Soul" (2018)
"Spotified" (2019)
"Sing It Again" (2019)
"Nechake Lecha" (2019)
"Simple City" (2019)
"Shalom Aleichem" (ft. Shlomo Katz) (2020)
"Anim Zemirot" (ft. Zusha) (2020)
"Yigdal" (2020)
"Jerusalem of Gold" (2020)
"Tzadik Katamar" (2020)
"Yom Shabbaton" (ft. Alex Clare) (2020)
"Shirat Haasavim" (2021)

Notable Covers 
"If I Were A Rich Man" (Fiddler on the Roof cover) (2017)
"Somewhere Over the Rainbow" (The Wizard of OZ Cover) (2018)

References

External links

Sibling musical duos
Israeli folk music groups
British folk rock groups
British emigrants to Israel
Musical groups from Manchester
2012 establishments in Israel
Jewish folk rock groups